Radislav Vladimirovich Orlovsky (born 9 March 1970) is a Belarusian professional football coach and a former player.

Career
He made his professional debut in the Soviet Second League in 1987 for Nart Cherkessk.

In 2002, Orlovsky signed for Zvezda-VA-BGU Minsk.

Honours
 Belarusian Premier League champion: 1992, 1992–93, 1993–94, 1994–95.
 Belarusian Cup winner: 1992, 1993–94.

References

External links

1970 births
Living people
Belarusian footballers
Belarus international footballers
Russian Premier League players
FC Dinamo Minsk players
FC Torpedo Moscow players
FC Torpedo-2 players
FC Fakel Voronezh players
FK Liepājas Metalurgs players
FC Starye Dorogi players
FC Dinamo-93 Minsk players
FC Energetik-BGU Minsk players
Belarusian expatriate footballers
Expatriate footballers in Russia
Association football midfielders
Sportspeople from Krasnodar